The 2007 Nationwide Tour season ran from January 25 to November 4. The season consisted of 32 official money golf tournaments; three of which were played outside the United States. The top 25 players on the year-end money list earned their PGA Tour card for 2008. Nick Flanagan earned his PGA Tour card by winning three tournaments on the season. He earned an immediate promotion to the PGA Tour after his third win at the Xerox Classic.

Schedule
The following table lists official events during the 2007 season.

Money leaders
For full rankings, see 2007 Nationwide Tour graduates.

The money list was based on prize money won during the season, calculated in U.S. dollars. The top 25 players on the tour earned status to play on the 2008 PGA Tour.

Awards

See also
2007 Nationwide Tour graduates

Notes

References

Korn Ferry Tour seasons
Nationwide Tour